Altamaha Town is an archaeological site in the Bluffton, South Carolina area. It was the location of Altamaha, the head town of the Lower Towns of the Yamasee tribe during their entire 30 year presence in South Carolina. Evidence dates the beginning of this period from 1707–1715, though it is possible the town was formed as early as 1695. There is also archaeological evidence to suggest that the site was also occupied intermittently prior to the arrival of the Yamasee, from at least 1500 BC to 1715 AD.

Altamaha was listed in the National Register of Historic Places on January 21, 1994.

References

Archaeological sites on the National Register of Historic Places in South Carolina
National Register of Historic Places in Beaufort County, South Carolina
Buildings and structures in Bluffton, South Carolina